Rajammal Packiyanathan Devadas (7 April 1919 – 17 March 2002) was an Indian nutritionist, educationist and a former chancellor of Avinashilingam Institute for Home Science and Higher Education for Women, popularly known as Avinashilingam Deemed University. She was a member of the State Planning Commission of Tamil Nadu, Tamil Nadu Commission for Women and the  elected vice president of the World Food Conference. The Government of India awarded her the fourth highest civilian honour of the Padma Shri in 1992.

Biography 
Rajammal Packiyanathan, born on 7 April 1919 to Muthiah Packiyanathan and Sornammal, in Chengam, North Arcot District (present Tiruvannamalai district) in the south Indian state of Tamil Nadu, graduated in science from Queen Mary's College, Chennai in 1944 after which secured a master's degree in science (1948), a master's degree in arts (1949) and a doctoral degree in philosophy (1950) from Ohio State University. 

Rajammal published several books and articles on the topics of nutrition and education and was the author of a book on T. S. Avinashilingam Chettiar. She was an honorary Colonel of the Tamil Nadu and Pondicherry chapters of the National Cadet Corps and a member of the Gandhigram Institute Rural Health and Family Planning, National Literacy Mission, Sigma Xi, Sigma Delta Epsilon, Omicron Nu and Phi Upsilon Omicron. She served as the president of the Nutrition Society of India from 1987 to 1991.

Awards and honours
 Recipient of doctoral degree (honoris Causea) from University of Madras, Oregon State University, Chandra Shekhar Azad University of Agriculture and Technology, Ohio State University and University of Ulster. 
 The Government of India awarded her the civilian honour of the Padma Shri in 1992 
 Seceived the Jamnalal Bajaj Award in 1998. 
 She was awarded a lifetime achievement award by the International Union of Nutritional Science (IUNS) at the 17th Congress in Vienna Austria 2001.

See also 
 Avinashilingam Institute for Home Science and Higher Education for Women

References

External links 
 

Recipients of the Padma Shri in literature & education
1919 births
2002 deaths
Indian women educational theorists
Indian nutritionists
Heads of universities and colleges in India
Ohio State University Graduate School alumni
Tamil writers
Indian scientific authors
Scientists from Tamil Nadu
20th-century Indian educational theorists
20th-century Indian women writers
20th-century Indian non-fiction writers
People from Tiruvannamalai district
20th-century Indian women scientists
Indian women science writers
20th-century Indian biologists
Women writers from Tamil Nadu
Indian medical writers
Women educators from Tamil Nadu
Educators from Tamil Nadu
20th-century women educators